Makata Pangkaja was a Balinese king from the Warmadewa dynasty. He was the son of King Udayana and Queen Mahendradatta, a Javanese princess. His royal title was Çri Dharmawangsa Wardhana Marakata Pangkajastanottunggadewa. He ascended to the throne in 1022 CE, and probably reigned until 1049 CE. His reign coincided with the reign of his elder brother, King Airlangga, who ruled the Mataram Kingdom in Java. After he died, the next king who ruled Bali was his younger brother, King Anak Wungsu. 

In several inscriptions, King Marakata is depicted as a ruler who was like Lord Vishnu, who often helps his suffering people. The Bwahan B inscription stated that the king granted the request of the Bwahan village elders to buy a portion of the royal hunting ground, because they lacked sufficient land for herding and collecting firewood. His name is mentioned in at least 10 inscriptions found on the island of Bali.

See also 
 Mahendradatta
 Udayana Warmadewa
 Warmadewa dynasty

References 

 Monarchs of Bali
 History of Bali
11th-century Indonesian people